Illasit is a settlement in Kenya's Rift Valley Province near the Kenya-Tanzanian border.

Location  
Illasit literally basks in the face and foothills of Mt. Kilimanjaro. It is approximately 270 km by road southeast of Nairobi, the capital city of Kenya.

Overview 
Illasit is small but growing town in Loitokitok sub county, southeastern Kenya. The town has its administrative HQ in Loitokitok sub-county  in which it is located. Illasit is served by social amenities like the Loitokitok general government hospital and Loitokitok Airstrip.

Population 
At this time there is no recent, reliable population estimate for the town of Illasit.

References 
 http://distancecalculator.globefeed.com/Kenya_Distance_Result.asp?fromplace=Laset%20(Rift%20Valley)%20&toplace=Nairobi%20(Nairobi%20Area)&fromlat=-2.95&tolat=-1.2833333&fromlng=37.5666667&tolng=36.8166667

Populated places in Kajiado County